"Am I Blue?" is a 1929 song copyrighted by Harry Akst (music) and Grant Clarke (lyrics), then featured in four films that year, most notably with Ethel Waters in the movie On with the Show. It has appeared in 42 movies, most recently Funny Lady, The Cotton Club and Downton Abbey: A New Era, and has become a standard covered by numerous artists.

Eddie Cochran version

Eddie Cochran recorded his version of "Am I Blue" sometime between May and August 1957. It was released on the B-side of Liberty Records single 55087. The A-side was "Drive In Show" which rose to number 82 on the Billboard charts.

Personnel used in the recording session:
 Eddie Cochran – guitars, ukulele, vocals
 Perry Botkin – rhythm guitar
 Connie "Guybo" Smith – double bass
 The Johnny Mann Chorus – backing vocals

Cher version

American singer-actress Cher recorded and released "Am I Blue" in 1973. It was released on single and the album Bittersweet White Light.

Chart performance Cher version

Other versions
 Annette Hanshaw recorded the song on May 31, 1929
 A recording of the song in a medley with "Blue Room" was made on July 14, 1942, by Eddy Duchin and released by Columbia Records as catalog number 36746, with the flip side a medley of "Sometimes I'm Happy" and "Pretty Baby."
 In 1944, the song was performed by Hoagy Carmichael and Lauren Bacall in the Howard Hawks directed film To Have and Have Not.
 The tune is played in a scene in the Warner Bros. cartoon Booby Hatched, when a duck is sitting on her eggs, her teeth chattering from the cold.
 In 1954, Dinah Washington recorded the song for the album After Hours with Miss "D"
 Jeri Southern recorded the song in 1957 for her Decca Records LP Jeri Gently Jumps.
 In 1957, early teen idol Ricky Nelson included the song on his debut album Ricky.
 Eddie Cochran, an early performer of rock and roll music, also recorded the song in 1957.
 Ray Charles on his 1959 Atlantic album The Genius of Ray Charles
 In 1961, Fats Domino recorded the song for the album Let the Four Winds Blow.
 Brenda Lee recorded her version for the album Reflections In Blue (1967).
 In 1972, Bette Midler recorded the song for her album The Divine Miss M (1972).
 In 1973, Cher released the song as the first and only single from her album of standards, Bittersweet White Light. It missed the Billboard Hot 100 chart, peaking at 111 in Bubbling Under Hot 100 Singles.
 The song was performed by the character of Batman (sung by Kevin Conroy, Batman's voice actor) in the 2004 episode of the animated series Justice League Unlimited, "This Little Piggy", as part of a bargain with Circe to release Wonder Woman from a curse placed upon her. Wonder Woman hums the tune at the end of that episode in order to tease Batman. Conroy has since uploaded it to his website.
 In 1969, Judy Garland and Johnnie Ray performed an (unreleased) duet cover of the song.
 Barbra Streisand recorded a version of "Am I Blue" (with a comedic ending) for her 1975 film Funny Lady.
 In 1978, Robert Gordon recorded the song for his Rock Billy Boogie album.
Diane Lane lipsynced it in the 1984 film The Cotton Club; the song was actually sung by Lesley Miller. It was not released on the soundtrack of the movie.
 In 1985, Nell Carter sang the song on the fifth episode of the fifth season of her hit sitcom Gimme a Break!.
 Linda Ronstadt recorded the song for her album For Sentimental Reasons (1986). 
 The deposed Qing emperor Henry Puyi (played by John Lone) sings the song during his 1925–31 playboy days in the Japanese concession of Tianjin in The Last Emperor (1987) by Bernardo Bertolucci.
 Billie Holiday's version of the song (Columbia 37586 US 1947) appeared in the 1989 movie Slaves of New York and 2009 movie Public Enemies.
 Charlie Rich recorded the song in 1991 for his 1992 release Pictures and Paintings.
 Rita Coolidge in 1975 on It’s Only Love and again on her 1996 album, Out of the Blues.
 In 1987, Charlie Robinson sang that song in a Season 4 episode of the sitcom Night Court.

Notes

References

External links
 List of "Am I Blue" versions on Second Hand Songs.

1929 songs
Songs with music by Harry Akst
1973 singles
Cher songs
Liberty Records singles
Grammy Hall of Fame Award recipients
Song recordings produced by Snuff Garrett
Songs written by Grant Clarke
Ethel Waters songs